Anderson Peak may refer to:

 Anderson Peak (Alberta) in Alberta, Canada
Anderson Peak (Judith Basin County, Montana) in Judith Basin County, Montana
Anderson Peak (Lake County, Montana) in Lake County, Montana
 Anderson Peak (Placer County, California)
 Anderson Peak (San Bernardino Mountains) in California

See also
Anderson Mountain
 Anderson Paak (born 1986), American singer, rapper, songwriter, record producer and multi-instrumentalist
Mount Anderson (disambiguation)